Kapurthala district in Punjab, India is made up of four subdistricts and has a total of 626 villages. The subdistricts are: Bhulath, which has 100 villages, Kapurthala, which has 245 villages, Phagwara, which has 106 villages, and Sultanpur Lodhi, which has 181 villages. The following is a list of villages grouped by subdistrict.

Bhulath

Kapurthala

Phagwara

Sultanpur Lodhi

References

 
Punjab, India-related lists
Lists of villages in India